The 2018 Adriatica Ionica Race/Following the Serenissima Routes was a five-stage men's professional road cycling race.

It was the first edition of the Adriatica Ionica Race/Following the Serenissima Routes. The race started with a team time trial on 20 June in Musile di Piave and finished on 24 June in Trieste. The race is part of the UCI Europe Tour, and is categorised by the UCI as a 2.1 race. The race was won by the Colombian rider Iván Sosa.

Teams
The 16 teams invited to the race were:

Route

Stages

Stage 1
20 June 2018 — Musile di Piave to Lido di Jesolo, team time trial (TTT)

Stage 2
21 June 2018 — Lido di Jesolo to Maser,

Stage 3
22 June 2018 — Mussolente to Passo Giau,

Stage 4
23 June 2018 — San Vito di Cadore to Grado,

Stage 5
24 June 2018 — Grado to Trieste,

Classification leadership
In the 2018 Adriatica Ionica, five jerseys were awarded. The general classification was calculated by adding each cyclist's finishing times on each stage. Time bonuses were awarded to the first three finishers on all stages apart from the time trial stage. The first three riders would get 10, 6, and 4 seconds, respectively. The leader of the general classification received a blue jersey sponsored by Geo&tex2000. This classification was considered the most important of the 2018 Adriatica Ionica, and the winner of the classification was considered the winner of the race.

The second classification was the points classification. Riders were awarded points for finishing in the top ten in a stage. Points were also won in intermediate sprints; ten points for crossing the sprint line first, six points for second place, three for third, two for fourth, and a single point for fifth. The leader of the points classification was awarded a red jersey sponsored by Full Speed Ahead.

The third classification was the mountains classification. Points were awarded to the riders that reached the summit of the most difficult climbs first. The climbs were categorized, in order of increasing difficulty, as third-, second-, and first-category and hors catégorie (read: "beyond category"). The leadership of the mountains classification was marked by a green sponsored by Prologo.

The fourth jersey represented the young rider classification, marked by a white jersey sponsored by Gabetti. Only riders born after 1 January 1993 were eligible; the young rider best placed in the general classification was the leader of the young rider classification.

The final classification was the "Fighting Spirit Prize" given after each stage to the rider considered, by a jury, to have "who struggled in order to achieve results in all the competitive moments of the race or the one who take action to start or carry out the longest breakaway". The winner wore an orange jersey sponsored by Suzuki. There was also a classification for teams, in which the times of the best three cyclists in a team on each stage were added together; the leading team at the end of the race was the team with the lowest cumulative time.

 In stage three, Simone Consonni, who was second in the points classification, wore the red jersey, because first placed Elia Viviani wore the blue jersey as leader of the general classification.
 In stage four, Floris Gerts, who was second in the mountains classification, wore the green jersey, because first placed Iván Sosa wore the blue jersey as leader of the general classification.
 In stage four, Giovanni Carboni, who was second in the best young rider classification, wore the white jersey, because first placed Iván Sosa wore the blue jersey as leader of the general classification.
 In stage five, Giovanni Carboni, who was second in the best young rider classification, wore the white jersey, because first placed Iván Sosa wore the blue jersey as leader of the general classification.

Final standings

General classification

Points classification

Mountains classification

Young rider classification

Team classification

References

External links
 

2018 UCI Europe Tour
2018 in Italian sport